The Colt is a 2005 television movie made for Hallmark Channel. The film is set during the American Civil War, and is based on the short story (Жеребёнок, Zherebyonok) by Nobel Prize winner Mikhail Sholokhov.

Plot
In 1864, an American Civil War troop struggles to survive when young Union soldier Jim Rabb (Ryan Merriman) discovers that his mare has given birth to a colt.  A superior officer orders Jim to shoot the foal because it may become a burden, but Jim - seeing the colt as a sign of hope and a reminder of the beauty of life - refuses. The colt remains with the men as they battle. When Confederates overtake the camp and steal the colt, Jim must risk his life retrieving it.

Cast
 Ryan Merriman as Jim Rabb
 Steve Bacic as Sgt. Longacre
 William MacDonald as Sgt. Woodruff
 Darcy Belsher as Convington
 Scott Heindl as Lt. Hutton

Critical reviews
Hal Erickson of All Movie Guide called the film "an uplifting tale of unassailable innocence in the midst of America's bloodiest war."

South Coast Today praised the film, saying its "symbolism is never so heavy-handed as to obscure an intelligent film filled with fine performances."

Awards

Won
2005 FAIF International Film Festival, Judges Choice Award for Best Feature Film
2005 LA Femme Film Festival, Best Director
2005 WorldFest Houston, Special Jury Award for Feature Made for Television/Cable

Nominated
2006 Humanitas Prize, 90 Minute or Longer Category
2006 Writers Guild of America, USA, WGA Award (TV) Long Form - Adapted

External links

The Colt at RHI Entertainment

References

2005 television films
2005 films
Hallmark Channel original films
American Civil War films
Films about horses
2000s American films